The chapter is the basic unit of organization in Phi Mu Alpha Sinfonia.  The designation of chapter has been given to at least three different kinds of organization over the history of the fraternity:  collegiate, alumni, and professional.  The only form currently in use, the collegiate chapter, is defined as an organization at a college, university, or school of music that has been granted a charter by the fraternity. There are currently 251 active collegiate chapters spread across 38 provinces in the United States, and 450 chapters have been chartered in total over the history of the organization.

Alumni chapters existed between 1966 and 1976, after which they were designated as professional chapters by the 1976 National Assembly at the University of Evansville.  Professional chapters, notable for being able to initiate brothers, lasted from the creation of an experimental chapter in Washington, D.C. in 1974 until the final two professional chapters dissolved in the 1985-1988 triennium.  During the 1997 National Assembly in Cincinnati, Ohio, the fraternity returned to the idea of an organizational space for alumni engagement by establishing alumni associations.  The fraternity currently has 24 alumni associations spread over 19 provinces.

Formation and closure
Chapters are formed by the granting of charters to petitioning groups at qualified institutions of higher education. The only basic qualification for an institution to house a chapter of Phi Mu Alpha Sinfonia is that it offer a four-year degree in music. Prior to receiving a charter, petitioning groups must seek recognition as a colony, which is the designation given to a developing chapter. After being recognized as a colony, the petitioning group must complete the fraternity's Colony Program, which consists of numerous activities designed to help the group organize itself as an effective and viable branch of the fraternity. After completing all aspects of the fraternity's Colony Program, a colony may be approved by the Commission on Standards to receive a chapter charter.

Chapter charters may be recalled by the Commission on Standards for operational or disciplinary reasons, either placing the chapter on inactive status  or by expelling the chapter by revoking its charter  respectively. Inactive chapters may be reactivated through the Colony Program, but groups at institutions that formerly housed chapters of Sinfonia that were expelled or had their charter revoked must wait no less than seven years before recolonizing.

Oldest chapters

The Alpha chapter, founded in 1898 at the New England Conservatory of Music as the Sinfonia Club, was active until 1977. It experienced a brief revival from 1991 to 1995, but closed once more and has remained inactive. The Delta chapter at Ithaca College in Ithaca, New York was chartered on January 28, 1901, and is the oldest continuously active chapter of the fraternity.  Three other chapters have passed the 100 year milestone:  the Zeta chapter at the University of Missouri (chartered 1907), the Iota chapter at Northwestern University (chartered 1910), and the Mu chapter at the University of Oklahoma (chartered 1912).

Activities and authority
Once chartered, collegiate chapters have the authority to conduct activities in the name of the fraternity for the purpose of furthering its Object. The fraternity's collegiate chapters participate in a broad range of activities emphasizing brotherhood, service, and music. In addition to purely social activities for the benefit of their members, chapters typically conduct activities such as:
taking music into the community through the Mills Music Mission.
sponsoring concerts of American music.
sponsoring jazz and choral festivals.
sponsoring all-campus sings and Broadway-style reviews.
organizing members into performing ensembles ranging from big bands to barbershop quartets.
commissioning new musical works.
bringing prominent music performers and clinicians to their campuses.

At a minimum, chapters are required to annually sponsor at least one program devoted exclusively to the music of American composers and to celebrate Founder's Day (October 6) and Chapter Day (the chartering date of the chapter). Chapters are also encouraged to meet the requirements of the fraternity's Chapter Citations program, which recognizes chapters annually for achievement in the areas of Chapter Operations, Membership Development, Alumni Relations, Musical Achievement, Province Interaction, Special Projects, and Fraternal Tradition.

Naming conventions
Like those of many other Greek-letter fraternities, chapters of Phi Mu Alpha have names consisting of either one or two Greek letters. The names are issued in alphabetical order according to the dates on which the chapters are chartered. For instance, Alpha is the name given to the founding chapter, followed by Beta for the second chapter, then Gamma, and so on. Once the Greek alphabet had been exhausted by using single letters, two-letter names began to be issued, starting with Alpha Beta, then Alpha Gamma, then Alpha Delta, etc.

Names using the same two Greek letters, such as Alpha Alpha, Beta Beta, Gamma Gamma, etc., were not used. Also, in the first cycle of chapter naming, letters that came before the first letter of a chapter's name in the Greek alphabet were not used for the second letter. Thus, after Alpha Omega the next name issued was Beta Gamma, not Beta Alpha. Likewise, after Beta Omega, the next name issued was Gamma Delta; Gamma Alpha and Gamma Beta were not used. Using this system, 300 names could be generated, but due to the fraternity's rapid expansion in the mid 20th century all of the possible names were exhausted in 1969. Beginning in that year (after the last name possible under the old system, Psi Omega, was issued), the fraternity began to issue the unused two-letter names beginning with Beta Alpha. However, names with two identical Greek letters were still not used. Without using such repeated-letter names, there is a total of 576 possible one- and two-letter names, of which 444 have been issued to date. The only exception to the repeated-letter chapter name rule is Alpha Alpha. However, Alpha Alpha is not an actual collegiate chapter, but is instead the chapter designation used when initiating men as National Honorary members.

Colony names take one of two forms. If a chapter was previously chartered at an institution, then a colony that is later recognized at that institution is given the name of the chapter that was originally there. Upon the colony's successful completion of the Colony Program, the original chapter is reactivated and the original charter document (if it still exists) is reissued along with a separate Certificate of Reactivation. If there has never been a chapter at an institution, then a colony there is issued a name consisting of the state where the institution is located followed by a single Greek letter to distinguish it from any other colonies in the state (e.g., "Texas Gamma," "Ohio Beta," etc.). Upon the colony's successful completion of the Colony Program, a new chapter is installed and a charter with the next chapter name in sequence is issued.

Naming anomalies
The list of chapters in the next section includes notes relating to the many quirks that have occurred in the history of the naming of chapters. Two names, Gamma and Zeta, were reissued in the fraternity's early days, while two other names, Mu Epsilon and Mu Kappa, have never been issued and likely never will considering how far out of sequence they would be. The Mu Kappa name designation was approved for use by a group at Kentucky State University in June 1980, but by September 1981 circumstances had changed such that the necessary faculty support and student interest had dissolved before a chapter could be formed, and the National Executive Committee officially withdrew the approval for a charter on September 3, 1981. During the 1950s and 1960s, rapid expansion meant that chapters were being chartered on dates very close to one another. In fact, in 1960 as many as ten chapters were chartered in the span of a single week. This resulted in many chapter names being issued that did not necessarily correspond to the relative order in which the chapters were chartered. Finally, there are three sheltering institutions that have each housed two chapters with different names. In all three of these cases, the reason is that the first chapter chartered at the institution was expelled and the later petitioning group requested that a new chapter be installed instead of the expelled chapter being reactivated.

List of chapters
Phi Mu Alpha Sinfonia has chartered 453 collegiate chapters in its history, of which 250 are currently active. The following table contains a comprehensive listing of all 453 collegiate chapters in the order that they were chartered. Footnotes appear immediately below the table.

Notes

Current colonies
There are currently three colonies in Phi Mu Alpha Sinfonia. The colonies are listed in the order established.

References

Bibliography
Phi Mu Alpha Sinfonia.  "National Constitution and Bylaws."  2012 revision.  Accessed 5 September 2015. 
Phi Mu Alpha Sinfonia.  "Phi Mu Alpha Sinfonia Fraternity Colony Program Overview."  Accessed 5 September 2015.  
Underwood, T. Jervis. Phi Mu Alpha Sinfonia:  A Centennial History, 2nd ed. Edited by David R. Irving.  Phi Mu Alpha Sinfonia, 2005.

Phi Mu Alpha Sinfonia
Phi Mu Alpha Sinfonia